Sir David Herbert Mervyn Davies, MC, TD (17 January 1918 – 12 May 2015) was a British barrister and High Court judge who sat in the Chancery Division from 1982 to 1993. He is best remembered for ordering the sequestration of assets belonging to the National Union of Mineworkers during the miners' strike of 1984–1985.

References 

 https://www.ukwhoswho.com/view/10.1093/ww/9780199540891.001.0001/ww-9780199540884-e-12987
 https://www.thetimes.co.uk/article/sir-mervyn-davies-23rf5k626zz

Knights Bachelor
2015 deaths
Recipients of the Military Cross
English solicitors
Members of Lincoln's Inn
English King's Counsel
20th-century King's Counsel
Chancery Division judges
British Army personnel of World War II